The joint European standard for size labelling of clothes, formally known as EN 13402 Size designation of clothes, is a European standard for labelling clothes sizes which has been partially adopted, and aims to make it easier to find and select fitting clothes. The standard is based on body dimensions measured in centimetres, and as such aims to allow for finding fitting clothing sizes by measuring the body with a tape measure (for instance at home) or by comparing to already fitting clothing which conforms to the EN 13402 standard. The standard can therefore contribute to more environmentally friendly trade as it can lead to less return of clothes bought on the internet.

The standard aims to replace several older national clothing size systems in popular use before the year 2007, but the degree of introduction of the new system has varied from country to country. For bras, gloves and children's clothing it is the de facto standard in most of Europe already, while China has introduced the standard for all types of clothing. Few other countries are known to have followed suit.

The Spanish Ministry of Health and Consumer Affairs has commissioned a study to categorize female body types with a view to harmonising Spanish clothing sizes with EN-13402.

Background
There are three approaches for size-labelling of clothes:

 Body dimensions The label states the range of body measurements for which the product was designed. (For example: bike helmet label stating "head girth: 56–60 cm" or shoes labeled "foot length: 280 mm")
 Product dimensions The label states characteristic dimensions of the product. (For example: jeans label stating inner leg length of the jeans in centimeters or inches (not inner leg measurement of the intended wearer))
 Ad hoc sizes or vanity sizes The label states a size number or code with no obvious relationship to any measurement. (For example: Size 12, XL)

Traditionally, clothes have been labelled using many different ad hoc size systems.
This approach has led to a number of problems:
 For many types of garments, size cannot be adequately described by a single number because a good fit requires a match between two (or sometimes three) independent body dimensions. This is a common issue in sizing jeans.
 Ad hoc sizes have changed with time due to changing demographics and increasing rates of obesity. This is often portrayed in media as vanity sizing.
 Scalar ad hoc sizes based on 1950s anthropometric studies are no longer adequate, as changes in nutrition and life style have shifted the distribution of body dimensions.
 Mail order requires accurate methods for predicting the best-fitting size.
 Country-specific and vendor-specific labels incur additional costs.

Therefore, the European standards committee CEN/TC 248/WG 10 started in 1996 the process of designing a new modern system of labelling clothes sizes, resulting in the standard EN 13402 "Size designation of clothes".

It is based on:
 body-dimensions
 the metric system (SI)
 data from new anthropometric studies of the European population performed in the late 1990s
 similar existing international standards (ISO 3635, etc.)

EN 13402-1: Terms, definitions and body measurement procedure

The first part of the standard defines the list of body dimensions to be used for designating clothes sizes, together with an anatomical explanation and measurement guidelines. All body dimensions are measured, preferably without or as few as possible clothes, in centimeters, except for the body mass.

The standard also defines a pictogram that can be used in language-neutral labels to indicate one or several of the following body dimensions.

  head girth  maximum horizontal girth (circumference) of the head measured above the ears
  neck girth  girth of the neck measured with the tape measure passed 2 cm below the Adam's apple and at the level of the 7th cervical vertebra
  chest girth (♂ men) maximum horizontal girth measured during normal breathing with the subject standing erect and the tape-measure passed over the shoulder blades (scapulae), under the armpits (axillae), and across the chest
  bust girth (♀ women) maximum horizontal girth measured during normal breathing with the subject standing erect and the tape-measure passed horizontally, under the armpits (axillae), and across the bust prominence (preferably measured with moderate tension over a brassiere that shall not deform the breast in an unnatural way and shall not displace its volume)
  underbust girth (♀ women) horizontal girth of the body measured just below the breasts
  waist girth  girth of the natural waistline between the top of the hip bones (iliac crests) and the lower ribs, measured with the subject breathing normally and standing erect with the abdomen relaxed
  hip girth (♀ women) horizontal girth measured round the buttocks at the level of maximum circumference
  height  vertical distance between the crown of the head and the soles of the feet, measured with the subject standing erect without shoes and with the feet together (for infants not yet able to stand upright: length of the body measured in a straight line from the crown of the head to the soles of the feet)
  inside leg length  distance between the crotch and the soles of the feet, measured in a straight vertical line with the subject erect, feet slightly apart, and the weight of the body equally distributed on both legs
  arm length distance, measured using the tape-measure, from the armscye/shoulder line intersection (acromion), over the elbow, to the far end of the prominent wrist bone (ulna), with the subject's right fist clenched and placed on the hip, and with the arm bent at 90°
  hand girth maximum girth measured over the knuckles (metacarpals) of the open right hand, fingers together and thumb excluded
  foot length horizontal distance between perpendiculars in contact with the end of the most prominent toe and the most prominent part of the heel, measured with the subject standing barefoot and the weight of the body equally distributed on both feet
  body mass measured with a suitable balance in kilograms

EN 13402-2: Primary and secondary dimensions

The second part of the standard defines for each type of garment one "primary dimension". This is the body measure according to which the product must be labelled Where men's garments use the chest girth, women's clothes are designed for a certain bust girth.

For some types of garment, a single measure may not be sufficient to select the right product. In these cases, one or two "secondary dimensions" can be added to the label.

The following table shows the primary (in bold) and secondary dimensions listed in the standard, leaving out the redundant words girth, length and size for better overview.

EN 13402–3: Measurements and intervals

The third part of the standard defines preferred numbers of primary and secondary body dimensions.

The product should not be labelled with the average body dimension for which the garment was designed (i.e., not "height: 176 cm."). Instead, the label should show the range of body dimensions from half the step size below to half the step size above the design size (e.g., "height: 172–180 cm.").

For heights, for example, the standard recommends generally to use the following design dimensions, with a step size of 8 cm:

For trousers, the recommended step size for height is 4 cm:

The standard defines similar tables for other dimensions and garments, only some of which are shown here.

Men

The standard sizes and ranges for chest and waist girth are defined in steps of 4 cm:

 drop = waist girth − chest girth.
Example: While manufacturers will typically design clothes for chest girth = 100 cm such that it fits waist girth = 88 cm, they may also want to combine that chest girth with neighbouring waist girth step sizes 84 cm or 92 cm, to cover these drop types (−16 cm and −8 cm) as well.

The standard also suggests that neck girth can be associated with chest girth:

The standard further suggests that arm length can be associated with height:

Women

Dress sizes
The standard sizes and ranges for bust, waist and hip girth are mostly based on a step of 4 cm, for larger sizes 5 cm (hip) or 6 cm (bust and waist):

Bra sizes

The European standard EN 13402 also defines bra sizes based on the "bust girth" and the "underbust girth". Bras are labeled with the under bust girth (rounded to the nearest multiple of 5 cm), followed by a letter code that indicates the "cup size" defined below, according to this table defined by the standard.

The standard sizes for brassiere are based on a step of 5 cm:

The secondary dimension cup size can be expressed in terms of the difference
 cup size = bust girth − underbust girth
and can be labelled compactly using a letter code appended to the underbust girth:

Example 1 Bra size 70B is suitable for women with underbust girth 68–72 cm and bust girth from 82–84 cm to 86–88 cm.
Example 2 A woman with an underbust girth of 89 cm and a bust girth of 108 cm has cup size 19 cm (= 108 cm – 89 cm) or "D". Her underbust girth rounded to the nearest multiple of 5 cm is 90 cm. Therefore, her bra size according to the standard is 90D.

Letter codes

For clothes where a larger step size is sufficient, the standard also defines a letter code. This code represents the bust girth for women and the chest girth for men. The standard does not define such a code for children.
Each range combines two adjacent size steps. The ranges could be extended below XXS or above 3XL if necessary.

EN 13402-4: Coding system

The fourth part of the standard is still under review. It will define a compact coding system for clothes sizes. This was originally intended primarily for industry use in databases and as a part of stock-keeping identifiers and catalogue ordering numbers, but later users have also expressed a desire to use compact codes for customer communication. Writing out all the centimetre figures of all the primary and secondary measures from EN 13402-2 can – in some cases – require up to 12 digits. The full list of centimetre figures on the pictogram contains a lot of redundancy and the same information can be squeezed into fewer characters with lookup tables. EN 13402-4 will define such tables.

An earlier draft of this part of the standard attempted to list all in-use combinations of EN 13402-3 measures and assigned a short 2- or 3-digit code to each. Some of the industry representatives involved in the standardization process considered this approach too restrictive. Others argued that the primary dimension in centimetres should be a prominent part of the code. Therefore, this proposal, originally expected to be adopted in 2005, was rejected.

Since then, several new proposals have been presented to the CEN working group. One of these, tabled by the European Association of National Organisations of Textile Traders (AEDT), proposes a 5-character alphanumeric code, consisting of the 3-digit centimetre figure of the primary body dimension, followed by one or two letters that code a secondary dimension, somewhat like the system already defined for bra sizes. For example, an item designed for 100 cm bust girth, 104 cm  hip girth and 176 cm height could bear the compact size code "100BG". This proposal was agreed upon in 2006, but later disregarded. A paper by Bogusławska-Bączek published in 2010 showed that there were still significant difficulties in identifying clothing sizes.

Related links
 Clothing sizes
 Shoe size, hereunder the international Mondopoint
 US standard clothing size
 Vanity sizing

References

External links
 All change for clothes sizes – press release by the British Standards Institution (11 March 2002)
 Dress size harmonization – press release by the British Standards Institution (24 October 2003)
 John Scrimshaw: One size really might fit all. Fashion Business International, March 2004.
 Karryn Miller: Sizing a headache for globalising apparel industry. just-style, 27 July 2010.
 BodyDim: program for calculating out EN13402 values
 European clothing standard EN 13402 pictogram generator

 

Sizes in clothing
13402
Metrication
Fashion design